This Is America is the third studio album (and second solo album) by Kim Weston. Released in 1968, the album focuses on the theme of patriotism. It is well known for its recording of "Lift Every Voice and Sing", later released as a single.

Track listing

Side one
 "This Is America" (Beth Beatty, Ernie Shelby)
 "When Johnny Comes Marching Home" (Arranged and adapted by Marty Paich)
 "If I Ruled the World" (Cyril Ornadel, Leslie Bricusse)
 "The Impossible Dream (The Quest)" (Joe Darion, Mitch Leigh)
 "Born Free" (Don Black, John Barry)
 "Somewhere" (Leonard Bernstein)

Side two
 "The Exodus Song" (Ernest Gold, Pat Boone)
 "People" (Bob Merrill, Jule Styne)
 "Touch the Earth" (Gail Allen, Jeri Southern)
 "Lift Ev'ry Voice and Sing" (James Weldon Johnson, John Rosamond Johnson)
 "The House I Live In" (Earl Robinson, Lewis Allan)
 "This Is My Country" (Al Jacobs, Don Raye)

Personnel
Marty Paich - arrangements
Val Valentin - director of engineering
Tom Nixon - recording supervisor
Acy R. Lehman - art direction
John Sposato - cover art

External links
 

1968 albums
Kim Weston albums
Albums produced by William "Mickey" Stevenson
Albums arranged by Marty Paich
MGM Records albums